Francesco Salviati may refer to:
 Francesco Salviati (bishop) (died 1478), archbishop of Pisa, involved in the Pazzi Conspiracy
 Francesco Salviati (painter) (also Francesco de' Rossi, Il Salviati, etc) (1510–1563), Mannerist painter

See also
Salviati (disambiguation)